John Satterfield Sandars, CVO, PC (15 January 1853 – 29 March 1934) was a British barrister who served as Private Secretary to Arthur Balfour, Prime Minister of the United Kingdom. He was informally known as 'Jack' Sandars to those close to him.

Early life 
John Sandars was the only son of Charles Sandars, an estate and colliery agent of Mackworth, Derbyshire. Educated at the local Repton School, he went on to read Law at Magdalen College, Oxford in 1871.

Career 
Sandars was called to the Bar by Lincoln's Inn in 1877, practising on the Midland Circuit until 1885, when he was appointed as private secretary to Henry Matthews, the Home Secretary. In the 1892 general election, he unsuccessfully contested the parliamentary seat of Mid-Derbyshire. Three years later, in 1895, he became the private secretary to Arthur Balfour, then Leader of the House of Commons and First Lord of the Treasury. He remained with Balfour until 1911, when the latter resigned as the leader of the Conservative Party.

Sandars was sworn of the Privy Council and appointed CVO in the 1905 Prime Minister's Resignation Honours.

Personal life 
He married Harriette Grace Mary, daughter of Sir William Don on 10 August 1892. John Sandars died at home at Eastley End House near Thorpe, Surrey on 29 March 1934 at the age of 80.

References 

 https://www.oxforddnb.com/view/10.1093/ref:odnb/9780198614128.001.0001/odnb-9780198614128-e-45591

Sandars, John Satterfield
Sandars, John Satterfield
Alumni of Magdalen College, Oxford
Principal Private Secretaries to the Prime Minister
Place of birth missing